Harvey Delano Esajas (born 13 June 1974) is a Dutch former footballer who played as a defender.

Club career

Feyenoord and Eerste Divisie
Born in Amsterdam of Surinamese descent, Esajas made his debut in professional football in 1993–94 with Feyenoord, after spending his youth years in the football schools of R.S.C. Anderlecht and AFC Ajax. Prior to the start of the season, he was the key factor in the Helderse affaire: Feyenoord played a friendly match with an amateur side, the Helderse Selectie, and during the game he knocked down opponent Ronald Schouten, breaking his jaw but not being eventually suspended for his actions.

Esajas made his Eredivisie debut on 24 October 1993 against Ajax, and managed to score in one of the most prestigious clash in the Netherlands, in a 2–2 away draw. Despite this promising start he did not make it as a regular in Feyenoord's first team, and only played in five games; during his first season at De Kuip the team won the Dutch Cup and, the following campaign, he only appeared three times, while he was not used at all in 1995–96.

Upon leaving Rotterdam, Esajas signed with FC Groningen. There, he was played rarely, subsequently moving to SC Cambuur in the second division, where he did not feature at all. In 1998–99 he appeared in seven matches for Dordrecht'90, also in the second level.

Retirement and return
Esajas decided to move abroad and was able to have trials at ACF Fiorentina and Torino F.C. in Italy, but neither offered him a contract. He then tried to find a club in Spain, spending some time at CD Móstoles, Real Madrid Castilla and Zamora CF, but did not succeed at any, thus deciding to end his career and find a regular job at a Spanish circus.

Esajas disappeared out of the world of football for a long time, until 2004 (during this time, he also worked as a dish washer). Upon a visit to his close friend Clarence Seedorf, who played at A.C. Milan, he spoke of his wish to return to professional football – at that time his weight was over 100 kg and he had not touched a ball in three years time. Seedorf went to club coach Carlo Ancelotti and told him as a joke he could have a defender for free. The manager's reaction was skeptical, but he accepted the challenge and gave Esajas the opportunity to train at Milanello for a while; in three months time, the player lost 15 kg and in June 2004 was in footballing shape again, thus being offered a contract.

When 2004–05's Serie A began, Esajas was one of Milan's last options on the bench, but in January 2005 he was given a few minutes of play for his hard work. He came on as a substitute three minutes before time in the Italian Cup match against U.S. Città di Palermo, for Massimo Ambrosini, and was even able to create a scoring opportunity for Jon Dahl Tomasson, who headed over the bar in an eventual 2–0 home win.

Subsequently, Esajas was part of the Milan squad in Istanbul when they played and lost on penalties to Liverpool in the 2005 Champions League final. He did not play any more matches for the Rossoneri, but moved to Serie C team A.C. Legnano instead, also representing Calcio Lecco 1912 in that same season before ending his career for the second and definitive time.

Esajas himself described the story of his career as follows: "The incredible story of the man who made the impossible thing possible."

Club statistics

References

External links
Stats at Voetbal International 

1974 births
Living people
Dutch sportspeople of Surinamese descent
Converts to Islam
Footballers from Amsterdam
Dutch footballers
Association football defenders
Eredivisie players
Eerste Divisie players
Feyenoord players
FC Groningen players
SC Cambuur players
FC Dordrecht players
Segunda División B players
Real Madrid Castilla footballers
Zamora CF footballers
Serie C players
A.C. Milan players
A.C. Legnano players
Calcio Lecco 1912 players
SVB Eerste Divisie players
S.V. Transvaal players
Dutch expatriate footballers
Expatriate footballers in Belgium
Expatriate footballers in Spain
Expatriate footballers in Italy
Dutch expatriate sportspeople in Belgium
Dutch expatriate sportspeople in Spain
Dutch expatriate sportspeople in Italy
SC Buitenveldert players